Jon Stewart: The Kennedy Center Mark Twain Prize for American Humor was a variety special that aired June 21, 2022 on PBS. The show honored comedian Jon Stewart who was being awarded with the Mark Twain Prize for American Humor which was presented at the John F. Kennedy Center for the Performing Arts in Washington D.C. Those who helped celebrate his accomplishments included Dave Chappelle, Steve Carell, John Oliver, Stephen Colbert, Ed Helms, Olivia Munn, Samantha Bee, Bassem Youssef, Jon Meacham, Jimmy Kimmel,  Pete Davidson and Bruce Springsteen. 

The event was filmed and shown on PBS. The broadcast of the ceremony was similar to the previous ceremony, Dave Chappelle: The Kennedy Center Mark Twain Prize for American Humor in 2019, in that it used archival footage of Dave Chappelle performing standup, clips from The Daily Show with Jon Stewart and Stewart's testimony at the congressional hearing for the 9/11 Victim's Compensation Fund.

Production

Summary 
In order of appearance
Bruce Springsteen opens the show singing The Beatles' "Come Together" with Gary Clark Jr. 
Dave Chappelle discussed his personal and professional relationship with Stewart at The Comedy Cellar in the 1990s.
Pete Davidson discussed Stewarts impact working with the 9/11 first responders and the Congressional testimony he gave on their behalf
Olivia Munn talked about her working relationship with Stewart as a correspondent on The Daily Show with Jon Stewart
Samantha Bee praised Stewart for highlighting racial and gender diversity among The Daily Show 
Steve Carell talked about the field assignments he would have to do on The Daily Show 
Jimmy Kimmel made selfs jokes at himself and working at The Man Show on Comedy Central
Bassem Youssef talked about Stewarts influence on him in Egypt and the impact he has had internationally 
John Oliver send in a pre-taped video making jokes about Stewart's death 
Ed Helms sang a various songs dressed as a dapper dan   
Jon Meacham talked about Jon's love of country, and ability to speak truth to power. 
Bruce Springsteen sang an acoustic version of his song "Born to Run"
Stephen Colbert spoke about his personal and professional friendship with Stewart at The Daily Show
9/11 first responders Jon Feil and Israel Guiterez Del Toro presented Stewart with the prize. 

When accepting the award, Stewart spoke about the threats to comedy saying:

In the audience:

Members of the audience included John Mulaney, Kim Kardashian, Yvonne Orji, Jason Jones, as well as Jen Psaki, Pete Buttigieg, Chasten Buttigieg, and Nancy Pelosi

Production 
The broadcast of the ceremony was similar to the previous ceremony, Dave Chappelle: The Kennedy Center Mark Twain Prize for American Humor in 2019, in that it used archival footage of Stewart's career. The clips included were from the 1990s MTV late-night program, The Jon Stewart Show, his Comedy Central show The Daily Show and his advocacy work for 9/11 first responders including his testimony at the congressional hearing for the 9/11 Victim's Compensation Fund. 

Clips were interspersed of Stewart with fellow comedians, family members, producers and Pete Buttigieg at the Winebar in Washington, D.C.

References